The Valley of Tomorrow is a 1920 American silent drama film directed by Emmett J. Flynn and starring William Russell, Mary Thurman and Harvey Clark.

Cast
 William Russell as Dabney Morgan
 Mary Thurman as 	Elenore Colonna
 Harvey Clark as 	Long John Morgan
 Fred Malatesta as 	Enrico Colonna 
 Pauline Curley as 	Cecelia May Morgan
 Frank Brownlee as 	Fang Morgan
 Frank Clark as 	Caleb Turner
 Louis King as 	Jed Morgan

References

Bibliography
 Connelly, Robert B. The Silents: Silent Feature Films, 1910-36, Volume 40, Issue 2. December Press, 1998.

External links
 

1920s American films
1920 films
1920 drama films
1920s English-language films
American silent feature films
Silent American drama films
American black-and-white films
Films directed by Emmett J. Flynn
Pathé Exchange films